NS4 may refer to:

Non-structural protein 4
 NS4 (HCV) - two viral proteins found in hepatitis C virus:
 NS4A
 NS4B
 Dengue virus NS4a and NS4b
 West Nile virus NS4A and NS4B

Transportation
 New Shepard 4, a Blue Origin reusable space launch vehicle booster rocket (booster #4)
 Blue Origin NS-4, a 2016 April 2 Blue Origin suborbital spaceflight mission for the New Shepard
 RAF N.S. 4, a British NS class airship
 Choa Chu Kang MRT/LRT station (station code: NS4) abbreviated as (NS4/BP1); Singapore
 Uguisunomori Station (station code: NS04), Kawanishi, Hyōgo Prefecture, Japan
 Higashi-Miyahara Station (station code: NS04), Kita-ku, Saitama, Japan
 Toyota NS4 - a plug-in hybrid concept car unveiled at the January 2012 North American International Auto Show.

Other
 Bedford (provincial electoral district), constituency N.S. 04; Nova Scotia, Canada
 Novelty seeking level 4, disorderliness
 NS-4; a fictional robot from the 2004 film, "I, Robot"
 Netscape Communicator - also known as Netscape 4, or NS4

See also

 NS (disambiguation)
 4 (disambiguation)